Natalia Sheludiakova is a lecturer and concert performer, currently teaching at the Sydney Conservatorium of Music.

Biography
Natalia Sheludiakova studied piano in Moscow with Professor Oleg Boshniakovich at the Gnessin Institute. In 1981 she won the All-Russian Chamber Music Competition in Leningrad and was awarded the coveted prize for the best accompanist in the 1988 and 1989 All-Soviet Cello Competitions. She has accompanied cellists proficiently in the Tchaikovsky competition and performed as a chamber musician with many acclaimed artists including Igor Oistrakh (violin), Victor Simon (Principal Cello, Bolshoi), Douglas Cummings (Principal Cello, LSO), Anthony Camden (Oboe), Yuri Semenov (Principal Cello, Moscow Symphony), Dimitri Jablonsky (cello) and Alexander Kniazev (cello). Her teachers have had relations with Czerny, Beethoven, Haydn and Skryabin.

Natalia was a member of the faculty at the Gnessin Institute from 1983 and Moscow Conservatorium from 1989 and a member of the prestigious Moscow Philharmonic Society. Arriving in Australia in 1992, Natalia was a member of the piano faculty, at the Brisbane Conservatorium of Music until coming to Sydney, where she has taught at the Sydney Conservatorium of Music since 1994.

Whilst being a teacher at the Sydney Conservatorium of Music, her students have gone on to postgraduate studies in France, Germany, England and Poland. This includes Wojciech Wisniewski, Natalia Raspopova, York Yu  and Julia Gu.

Concerts and Classes
Natalia has performed chamber music with many of Australia's finest instrumentalists including Ronald Thomas, Georg Pedersen, Wanda Wilkomirska, Carmel Caine, Frank Celata, Mark Walton, Ester van Stralen and Maria Marsden. She has played extensively as a member of the Kur-rin-gai Virtuosi in recitals, broadcasts & recordings on both ABC Classic FM and 2MBSFM, and tours including Hong Kong, Denmark, at the Moscow Conservatorium and throughout Australia.

In 2004 she performed Poulenc's Concerto for two pianos with Elen Rapoport and the Sydney Youth Orchestra. In 2007 she played the Brahms F minor quintet with Pietari Inkinen and members of  The Queensland Orchestra in Brisbane.

Natalia has given numerous masterclasses throughout Australia and overseas, for Conservatoria in Brisbane, Perth, Sydney, Canberra, Adelaide, Wollongong, Wellington, Paris, Hong Kong & Copenhagen. She has taught at Yale College, Oxford University, the Sorbonne and the Chopin Conservatory.

References

External links 
	
  Keyboard Faculty Listing at the Sydney Conservatorium of Music
  Australian Music Centre - Natalia Sheludiakova

Living people
Australian people of Russian descent
Australian classical pianists
Australian women pianists
Academic staff of the Sydney Conservatorium of Music
Piano pedagogues
21st-century classical pianists
Women music educators
Year of birth missing (living people)
21st-century women pianists